Edmond Georges Richard Wallace (4 October 1876 – 28 February 1915) was a French fencer. He competed in the individual épée event at the 1900 Summer Olympics. He was killed in action during World War I. He was the brother of fencer Richard Wallace.

See also
 List of Olympians killed in World War I

References

External links
 

1876 births
1915 deaths
French male épée fencers
Olympic fencers of France
Fencers at the 1900 Summer Olympics
French military personnel killed in World War I